Kailola's hardyhead (Craterocephalus kailolae) is a species of fish in the family Atherinidae endemic to Papua New Guinea. It reaches a maximum length of 6 cm. It inhabits shallow, clear creeks with gravel substrate. This species was described by Walter Ivantsoff, Lucy Crowley and Gerald R. Allen in 1987 with a type locality of a still backwater of Foasi Creek 3 kilometers west of Safia airstrip in Papua New Guinea. The specific name honours the Patricia J. Kailola, for her contribution to the knowledge of the ichthyology of Papua New Guinea.

References

Craterocephalus
Freshwater fish of Papua New Guinea
Fish described in 1987
Taxonomy articles created by Polbot